Stolin is a town in Brest Region, Belarus, and the administrative center of Stolin District, the largest district in the region. It has a population of 10,491 people (2012). Russian speech is common here, but villagers prefer their own dialects that are akin partly to the Belarusian language, partly the Ukrainian language.

History

Stolin grew up at the heart of the Polesia region on the Horyn River, at the crossroads of two important routes, one leading northwards to Pinsk, two others eastwards to Davyd-Haradok and Turov, that are now in Belarus, southwards to Sarny and Kyiv, that are now in Ukraine.

Archaeological evidence suggests that the area which Stolin now occupies, was settled as far back as the 12th century AD.  The first mention of Stolin dates to 1555.  There are three stories regarding the origins of the name "Stolin".  The first refers to a group of local fisherman who cast their fishing nets into a lake a pulled out 100 fish or Sto [100 in Russian] "Leeni" [a type of local fish].  The second story refers to a ferry-boat which sunk in the river and required 100 men with 100 ropes to drag it out [100 lines in Russian].  The third refers to twelve brothers who ruled over seven nearby cities and chose what became Stolin as their meeting place and capital city, hence the name may be a derivation of stol (table)> Stolny Gorod (capital city).

Stolin was occupied by the Germans from July 1941 to 1944. In August 1941, many Jewish refugees – especially women and children – from the nearby town of David-Gorodok came to Stolin. A ghetto was created in May 1942, surrounded by a barbed-wire fence. About 7,000 Jews lived in this small and unhealthy area, along the Bank River. The liquidation of the ghetto was conducted on September 11, 1942, by a squadron of German cavalry, the local police and the SD. The shooting took place near the airfield, in a large ditch.

International relations

Stolin is twinned with:
 Homberg, Germany

See also 
Stolin (Hasidic dynasty)
Pale of Settlement
Holocaust/Shoah

References

External links 

 
 Stolin at Belarus SIG
 More info and pictures of Stolin
 Photos on Radzima.org
 Stolin Yizkor Book (New York Public Library) - A Memorial to the Jewish Community of Stolin, 1952 (Hebrew)
 Views of Stolin

Towns in Belarus
Belarus–Ukraine border crossings
Populated places in Brest Region
Stolin District
Brest Litovsk Voivodeship
Pinsky Uyezd
Polesie Voivodeship
Holocaust locations in Belarus